The 1895 Ohio State Buckeyes football team represented Ohio State University in the 1895 college football season. The team was coached by Jack Ryder, who was in his fourth and final year of coaching the Buckeyes. The team captain was Renick W. Dunlap.

Schedule

References

Ohio State
Ohio State Buckeyes football seasons
Ohio State Buckeyes football